Pagoda Peak is a sharp peak, 3,040 m, between the heads of Tillite and Montgomerie Glaciers, 3 nautical miles (6 km) north of Mount Mackellar in Queen Alexandra Range. So named by the New Zealand Geological Survey Antarctic Expedition (NZGSAE) (1961–62) because of its shape.

Mountains of the Ross Dependency
Shackleton Coast